JCCC may refer to: 

 James Crabtree Correctional Center, in Helena, Alfalfa County, Oklahoma
 Jefferson City Correctional Center, in Missouri, U.S.
 Johnson County Community College, in Overland Park, Kansas, U.S.
 Joint Casualty and Compassionate Centre, see 
 Joint Centre of Control and Coordination, in the Russo-Ukrainian war (2014–)
 Jon Cougar Concentration Camp, a punk rock band
 Jonsson Comprehensive Cancer Center, Los Angeles, California